Bonay-ye Rashed (also Romanized as Bonāy-ye Rāshed; also known as Bāgh-e Rāshed and Band-e Rāshed) is a village in Howmeh Rural District, in the Central District of Deyr County, Bushehr Province, Iran. At the 2006 census, its population was 105, in 18 families.

References 

Populated places in Deyr County